Cantigny is a park in Wheaton, Illinois, U.S.

Cantigny may also refer to:

 Cantigny, Somme, a commune in the Somme department in Hauts-de-France in France
 Battle of Cantigny, in World War I
 , a U.S. Army Transport ship launched in 1919, later known as Arosa Kulm

See also
 
 Cartigny (disambiguation)
 Catigny, Oise department, France